"All Eyez" is a song by American rapper The Game featuring Jeremih; it was released on June 20, 2016, by Blood Money Entertainment, Fifth Amendment and Entertainment One Music. It is the first single off of his album, 1992. The song is produced by Scott Storch and Diego Ave.

Music video 
On August 16, 2016, The Game uploaded the music video for "All Eyez" on his YouTube and Vevo account. The music video was directed by Benny Boom. The video stars The Game himself as well as Jamaican Canadian recording artist / model Kreesha Turner with appearances by Jeremih and Scott Storch.

Track listing 
Digital download
"All Eyez"  — 3:35

Remix 
On June 24, 2016 the official remix was released featuring a new verse from rapper Chronic on his SoundCloud account.

Charts

Weekly charts

Year-end charts

Certifications

Release history

References

2016 singles
2016 songs
The Game (rapper) songs
Jeremih songs
MNRK Music Group singles
Song recordings produced by Scott Storch
Songs written by The Game (rapper)
Songs written by Jeremih
Songs written by Scott Storch